The Workers League was a Trotskyist political party in Ireland.

The group's origins lay in the League for a Workers Republic, an associate of the International Committee of the Fourth International (ICFI).  As that organisation began to split between the supporters of the Socialist Labour League (SLL) in Britain and those of the Internationalist Communist Organisation (OCI) in France.  The majority of the League for a Workers Republic sided with the OCI, but a minority broke away in 1970 to form the League for a Workers Vanguard.

When the ICFI split in 1972, the League for a Workers Vanguard changed its name to the "Workers League" and became an official affiliate of an ICFI dominated by Gerry Healy's Socialist Labour League. The Leagues activities involved general recruitment, the running of classes in Marxism, the selling of, first, The Workers' Press and, later, News Line- both published in England - and attempting interventions in industrial disputes'. In the mid-seventies, the League ran a Right to Work Campaign which involved a number of demonstrations in Dublin, one of which culminated in a 'mass' meeting in the Mansion House.  Jack O'Connor, who would later become General President of SIPTU in 2003, and President of ICTU in 2009, was an activist and organiser with the League for much of the 1970s. In the early 1970s, the League's General Secretary was Donal O'Sullivan. For a while, the League published Marxist Journal a general magazine that dealt with political and theoretical issues, which was edited by Paul McGuirk.  The League became moribund sometime around 1978.

1970 establishments in Ireland
1978 disestablishments in Ireland
All-Ireland political parties
Communist parties in Ireland
Defunct political parties in Northern Ireland
Defunct political parties in the Republic of Ireland
International Committee of the Fourth International
Political parties disestablished in 1978
Political parties established in 1970
Socialist parties in Ireland
Trotskyist organisations in Ireland
Trotskyist organisations in Northern Ireland